The Church of the Most Sacred Heart of Jesus in Szombierki (Polish: Kościół Najświętszego Serca Pana Jezusa w Szombierkach, Parafia Najświętszego Serca Pana Jezusa), commonly referred to as simply the "Church of the Most Sacred Heart of Jesus" is a church in Szombierki, a district of the city of Bytom.

Further reading 
 Travel info

 Szombierki
 Buildings and structures in Bytom
Churches completed in 1904